Stephen Lloyd Varble (1946 – January 6, 1984) was an American notorious performance artist and playwright in lower Manhattan during the 1970s. His work challenged both mainstream conceptions of gender and exposed the materialism of the established, institutionalized art world.

Personal life 
Varble was born in Owensboro, Kentucky in 1946 and was raised in a deeply religious household. He attended the University of Kentucky (B.A.) and moved to New York in 1969 to go to film school at Columbia University, where he received an M.F.A. in Film Directing in 1971. While in college, he became deeply involved in the local LGBT community.

In the early 1970s, Varble was a participant in the network of New York Fluxus artists due to his romantic relationship with Geoffrey Hendricks.  With Hendricks, he collaborated on a number of performances including works for Charlotte Moorman's Avant-Garde Festivals, Jacki Apple's "Identity Exchange" (1973), and Alison Knowles's Identical Lunch (1973). The two also performed in Europe in 1972, including Silent Meditation for the International Carnival of Experimental Sound (ICES), Hybrids at the Arts Club in London, and Silent Mediation for the Neue Galerie Aachen.

While he publicly identified as a man, some anecdotal evidence and personal writings imply that his conception of his own gender was less rigid. Because of this, some interpret Varble’s gender nonconforming art to be public exploration of fluid identity.

He was unabashedly against many aspects of capitalism, particularly wealth inequality and the commodification of art. This disapproval fueled many of his most impactful works. In 1977, Varble retreated from the public eye and moved in with his lover Daniel Cahill. During the final seven years of his life, he dedicated himself to filming an unfinished epic titled Journey to the Sun. He died from HIV/AIDS-related complications on January 6, 1984, at Lenox Hill Hospital in New York City.

Artistic career 

While in graduate school, Varble completed the book The Elegant Auctioneers for publication by Hill & Wang. The majority of the book was authored by Wesley Towner, with Varble writing the final chapters and editing of the manuscript after Towner's death in 1968.  The book is a history of art collecting and art auctioneering in the United States from the late nineteenth-century to the 1950s and 60s. He also assisted the young art historian Douglas Crimp with the lighting of his first exhibition, a show of Agnes Martin's work at the School of Visual Arts in 1971.

In the early 1970s, Varble also worked briefly for Andy Warhol's Interview magazine After receiving a grant from the City University of New York, he directed and produced the vocational film Heavy Duty: A Film Study of the Classroom Paraprofessional (1971).  He was active as a playwright in the early 1970s, and his Delicate Champions was put on as part of an experimental series at the Forum at Lincoln Center in 1971. In 1973, Varble directed his play Silent Prayer at La MaMa Experimental Theatre Club in the East Village of Manhattan (14–18, 21–25 March 1973). The production was designed by Geoffrey Hendricks (who also played the silent "God" character in the play), with music by David Walker and lights by Laura Rambaldi. In addition to writing and directing the play, Varble also designed the costumes for the production (with assistance from John Eric Broaddus). Notably, Eric Concklin, a regular at La MaMa and first director of Harvey Fierstein's Torch Song Trilogy, starred in the role of the father.

Stephen Varble’s first street performances were tame, compared to his most iconic works. Early outings feature him walking through Manhattan blindfolded, made vulnerable to the world around him. He also created a dress from slides of Hendrick’s family, metaphorically claiming his past.

Varble became most known in the mid-1970s for his public interventions in genderqueer costumes made from street trash, food waste, and found objects.  After breaking with Hendricks, Varble became increasingly interested in creating confrontational events that disrupted business and that presented him in costumes that complicated assumptions about gender and class, not only within the art world but society at large. The works that brought him to public notoriety were his "Costume Tours of New York," which involved Varble leading onlookers through unauthorized tours of SoHo galleries, boutiques, and museums. He targeted sites of luxury commerce, and his performances attacked issues of class and gender.  While his costumes often took the form of dresses, they would also combine male and female elements together. For example, one of the most iconic images of Varble features him wearing long strands of pearls draped down his hips and legs, contrasted by a pearlescent codpiece ironically fashioned to look like male genitalia. With these elements, Varble draws attention to things the viewer may expect him to hide, asserting his rejection of binary gender roles.

His most notorious such intervention was the Chemical Bank Protest in which he confronted a bank that had allowed a check to be forged against his account.  Wearing a costume made from netting, fake money, breasts made from condoms filled with cow's blood, and a toy fighter plane as a codpiece, he entered the bank and demanded that he be reimbursed for the money that was stolen from him. Upon being rebuffed, he punctured the condoms with a fountain pen  and used the cow’s blood to sign checks for $0,000,00.00, or ‘none million dollars’. According to some sources, his outburst was met with applause from visitors to the bank.10] Shortly thereafter, Varble wrote to the bank offering to become Chemical Bank’s PR representative and demanded an outrageous salary. This offer was quickly rejected. The novelist Fernanda Eberstadt was Varble's protégé in these years, and recalled some of his performances in a memoir published in 2018.

In 1975, he produced a series of performances called ‘Gutter Art’, which was performed in front of various high class boutiques. “Gutter Art” consisted of Varble stopping outside in a limousine, which was provided by his dedicated patron Morihiro Miyazaki, dressed in elaborate silk gowns. He would then retrieve dishes and silverware from its trunk, douse them in black ink, then sit in the gutter and wash them. This biting commentary on class inequality was highly controversial, and garnered him both positive and negative attention.

Varble had two exhibitions during his lifetime.  First, he staged one for himself in on the eve of his eviction from his loft on Franklin Street, New York, in 1976.  For its Gala Ending, he put on a collaborative performance with the assistance of Warhol stars and performance artists, including Mario Montez, Jackie Curtis, Agosto Machado, Taylor Mead, Ruth Truth, and John Eric Broaddus. This performance included, among other things, a giant pink satin skirt which allegedly covered most of the loft. Attendees joined Varble in tearing the skirt to shreds.  Second, he had a single commercial gallery exhibition in 1977 when Brooks Jackson Iolas Gallery in New York put on what Varble antagonistically titled "The Awful Art Show." When informed that he would be required to include artwork that could be sold, Varble produced chaotic line drawings, complete with anti-capitalist text. Each drawing was priced absurdly high to ensure that no one would even consider purchasing them.

Varble was also a subject for many famous photographers, including Peter Hujar, Jimmy De Sana, Allan Tannenbaum, Jack Mitchell, Fred McDarrah, Greg Day, Rose Hartman, and Anton Perich.

Varble stepped away from performance art around 1977, and instead began working on a video epic titled Journey to the Sun'. The video remains unfinished, but hours of footage were filmed, mainly within his and Cahill’s apartment. Its music includes compositions by his long-time friend Robert Savage and music Varble composed himself on an early home synthesizer, the Alpha Syntauri. The work is an homage to Greta Garbo, with whom Varble identified. The surviving tapes of Varble's Journey to the Sun project are archived and distributed by the Video Data Bank at the School of the Art Institute of Chicago. During his more reclusive period, he also produced several line drawings. Many of them included use of vitamins and enemas, perhaps showing that Varble was aware of his declining health. From these drawings, Varble also produced a series of Xerox works to be distributed freely and cheaply.

Exhibitions 
Solo
 2018–19: Rubbish and Dreams: The Genderqueer Performance Art of Stephen Varble, curated by David J. Getsy for the Leslie-Lohman Museum of Gay and Lesbian Art, New York, 29 September 2018 to 27 January 2019. 
 2019: The Gutter Art of Stephen Varble: Genderqueer Performance Art in the 1970s, photographs by Greg Day, curated by David J. Getsy for the ONE Archives Gallery & Museum, West Hollywood, California, 1 March to 17 May 2019. Traveled to The Horse Hospital, London, 26 October to 16 November 2019. 
 2018: Stephen Varble, An Antidote to Nature's Ruin on this Heavenly Globe: Prints and Video from the Early 1980s, curated by David J. Getsy for Institute 193, Lexington, Kentucky, 20 October to 1 December 2018
1977 Stephen Varble: The Awful Art Show, Brooks Jackson Iolas Gallery, New York, 29 March to 16 April 1977.
 1976 An Exhibition of Costumed Works by Stephen Varble, self-produced exhibition at Varble's loft on Franklin Street, New York, 10 April to 30 April 1976.

Group
 2019–20 Art After Stonewall, 1969-1989, curated by Jonathan Weinberg, Tyler Cann, and Drew Sawyer. Traveling exhibition organized by the Columbus Museum of Art (multiple venues)
 2018–19 Pushing the Envelope: Mail Art from the Archives of American Art, curated by Miriam Kienle for the Lawrence A. Fleischman Gallery, Archives of American Art, Smithsonian Institution, 10 August 2018 to 4 January 2019.

Bibliography 
 Abel-Hirsch, "The Immersive Approach of Greg Day," British Journal of Photography (17 December 2019)
Anderson, Alexandra. "The Chemical Bank Encounter and Other Events in the Artlife of Stephen Varble." Village Voice (10 May 1976): 130-31.
 Colucci, Emily. "A New Exhibition Resurrects One of New York's Most Subversive Performance Artists, an interview with David Getsy" them. (posted 3 October 2018)
 Cotter, Holland, "Stephen Varble: The Street Was His Stage, the Dress Was His Weapon," New York Times (11 January 2019): C15, C20.
 Crimp, Douglas. Before Pictures (Brooklyn: Dancing Foxes Press, 2016)
 Eberstadt, Fernanda. "I Bite My Friends," Granta 144 (August 2018). republished open access under an alternate title at lithub
Epps, Philomena. "The Trash Couture of Stephen Varble," Frieze (14 November 2019)
 Getsy, David J. "Rubbish and Dreams: The Genderqueer Performance Art of Stephen Varble." The Archive [of the Leslie-Lohman Museum of Gay and Lesbian Art] 62 (Winter 2017): 3-7.  Preview article for the * exhibition of the same name.
 Getsy, David J. "Stephen Varble's Xerographic Dreams", in Stephen Varble: An Antidote to Nature's Ruin on this Heavenly Globe, Prints and Video from the Early 1980s, exh. cat. (Lexington, Kentucky: Institute 193, 2018), 3-28.
 Herrera, Hayden. "Manhattan Seven." Art in America 65.4 (July–August 1977): 50-63.
 Kienle, Miriam. "'Rubbish and Dreams' in Kentucky's Queer Archives: A Conversation with David Getsy on Researching Stephen Varble." Under-Main (posted 21 November 2018)
 Maxim, Tyler. "Video by Stephen Varble." Screen Slate (posted 29 October 2018)
 Moss, Hilary. "A '70s Performance Artist Finds a New Audience." New York Times T Magazine, 26 September 2018.
 Nickas, Bob. "Stephen Varble: Now More Than Ever" Affidavit (posted 22 October 2018)
 Werther, Janet. "Discovering Stephen Varble". The MIT Press. Volume 41, no. 3, September, 2019. 17-27.

References

External links 

 "Rubbish and Dreams: The Genderqueer Performance Art of Stephen Varble" retrospective exhibition preview essay, Leslie-Lohman Museum of Gay and Lesbian Art
 Varble on VisualAIDS.org
Stephen Varble: Videoworks, archive at Video Data Bank, School of the Art Institute of Chicago
 1972 photographs of Varble performing "Four Blind Walks" as part of "Silent Meditation" at the Neue Galerie in Aachen, Germany
 2016 lecture by David Getsy, "Gutter Art: Stephen Varble and Genderqueer Performance on the Streets of 1970s New York" at the Leslie-Lohman Museum of Gay and Lesbian Art. 
 Recording of "Outing Queer Fluxus: Geoffrey Hendricks and David Getsy in Conversation," Block Museum of Art, Northwestern University, 20 April 2016. 
 1975 photograph of Varble ("Easter Parade") by Ernst Haas, International Center of Photography
 Jack Mitchell Archives blog post on Stephen Varble shoot from 1975
 Varble photographs by Hujar, DeSana, etc. on grantee page from Graham Foundation.
 1976 photograph of Varble by Peter Hujar, Morgan Library & Museum
 Varble's page on La MaMa Archives Digital Collections

1940s births
1984 deaths
People from Owensboro, Kentucky
American LGBT artists
People with non-binary gender identities
American performance artists
American male dramatists and playwrights
AIDS-related deaths in New York (state)
20th-century American male writers
20th-century American LGBT people
Non-binary artists